Rajae Benchemsi (born 1957 in Meknes) is a Moroccan writer. Benchemsi studied literature in Paris and wrote her thesis on Maurice Blanchot. She has published collections of poetry in Morocco and in France Fracture du désir, a collection of articles published by Actes Sud in 1998. In 2006, she wrote 'Houda et Taqi'. Rajae Benchemsi is also the host of a Moroccan television program on books.

Bibliography
Marrakech, lumière d'exil: roman, ed. Wespieser, 2003 
Fracture du désir, ed. Actes Sud, 1999 
La controverse des temps: roman, ed. Wespieser,  2006 
(together with Fraid Belkahia) Parole de Nuit, Marsam 1997,

References

Mesh, Cynthia J.: "Benchemsi Rajae. Fracture du désir ", French Review, vol. 74, no. 4 (March 2001), 834-5

1957 births
Living people
Moroccan writers in French
People from Meknes
Moroccan women writers